Jánossomorja is a town in Győr-Moson-Sopron County, Hungary. It is a connection between the two villages Szentpéter and Szentjános, located close to the Austrian border. Before 1946, those were German settlements with the German names St. Johann (St. John) and St. Peter.

External links

  in Hungarian

References 

Populated places in Győr-Moson-Sopron County